Robert J. "Frog" Holsey (1906 – death unknown) was an American Negro league pitcher between 1928 and 1932.

A native of Louisiana, Holsey made his Negro leagues debut in 1928 with the Chicago American Giants. He played three seasons with Chicago, and went on to play for the Cleveland Cubs and Nashville Elite Giants.

References

External links
 and Baseball-Reference Black Baseball stats and Seamheads

1906 births
Date of birth missing
Year of death missing
Place of birth missing
Place of death missing
Chicago American Giants players
Cleveland Cubs players
Nashville Elite Giants players
Baseball pitchers